Paris Métro Line 14 (French: Ligne 14 du métro de Paris) is one of the sixteen lines on the Paris Métro. It connects the stations Mairie de Saint-Ouen and Olympiades on a north-west south-east diagonal via the three major stations of Gare Saint-Lazare, The Châtelet–Les-Halles complex and the Gare de Lyon. The line goes through the centre of Paris, and reaches the communes of Saint-Ouen-sur-Seine and Clichy.

The first Paris Métro line built from scratch since the 1930s, it has been operated completely automatically since its opening in 1998, and the very positive return of that experiment motivated the retrofitting of Line 1 for full automation. Before the start of its commercial service Line 14 was known as project Météor, an acronym of  MÉTro Est-Ouest Rapide.

The line has been used as a showcase for the expertise of the RATP (the operator), and Systra and Siemens Transportation Systems (constructors of the rolling stock and automated equipment respectively) when they bid internationally to build metro systems.

A northward extension to Mairie de Saint-Ouen opened in December 2020. The line is being extended further north to Saint-Denis Pleyel and south to Orly Airport, as part of the Grand Paris Express project.

Chronology 
 15 October 1998: The new Line 14 was inaugurated between Madeleine and Bibliothèque F. Mitterrand.
 16 December 2003: The first northern extension from Madeleine to Saint-Lazare opened.
 26 June 2007: The first southern extension from Bibliothèque François Mitterrand to Olympiades opened.
 3 March 2014: The first of eighteen MP 05 trains goes into revenue service.
 12 October 2020: The first of thirty five MP 14 trains goes into revenue service.
 14 December 2020: The second northern extension from Saint-Lazare to Mairie de Saint-Ouen opened.
 28 January 2021: Porte de Clichy station opens to passengers.

Development

The Météor Project

The original line 14 linked Invalides with Porte de Vanves until 1976, when it was merged into the southern section of the current line 13.

Paris's east–west axis across has long been heavily travelled: Line 1 of the Métro began approaching saturation in the 1940s, necessitating the construction of Line A of the RER in the 1960s and '70s; which became the busiest urban routes in Europe (by 2010 there were more than a million passengers each working day). To improve service, the SACEM (Système d'aide à la conduite, à l'exploitation et à la maintenance --"Assisted driving, control and maintenance system") was installed on the central run of Line A in September 1989. This improved efficiency and reduced the interval between trains to just two minutes, though an improvement ultimately insufficient to absorb the increasing demand. To cater permanently to demand on the busy artery between Auber and Gare de Lyon new rail lines would have to be built.

Two proposals were made by the transport companies: the SNCF suggested a new tunnel between Châtelet and Gare de Lyon for Line D of the RER allowing traffic to circulate from the north and south-east of Île-de-France. More importantly it proposed "Project EOLE" ("Est-Ouest Liaison Express"), the creation of a new standard gauge line, initially from Paris's eastern suburbs to Saint-Lazare, then an extension onwards to the western suburbs.

In 1987, the RATP proposed "project Météor", ("MÉTro-Est-Ouest-Rapide") the creation of a new Métro line, from Porte Maillot on the edge of the 16th arrondissement to the Maison Blanche district in the 13th, an area poorly served by transport despite its large population. The project would fit well with the regeneration of the Tolbiac district on the left bank around the new Bibliothèque Nationale de France, in that arrondissement.

The plans to go to Porte Maillot were eventually abandoned in favour of a terminus at Saint-Lazare, with the later possibility of extending the line to Clichy and assimilating the Asnières branch of Line 13, thus simplifying its complicated operation.

Given the pressing need, the council of Ministers of Michel Rocard's government approved the project in October 1989. However, budgetary constraints forced the reduction of both. In the first stage, EOLE would be but a simple extension of trains from the suburbs to the new underground station at  Saint-Lazare and Météor limited to the central Madeleine – Bibliothèque run, thus leaving the main railway station of Saint-Lazare and the heart of the 13th arrondissement unserved.

Construction 

From November 1989 until the end of 1992 exploratory shafts and galleries were dug; tunnelling proper lasted from July 1993 until early 1995. The terrain, made mostly of loosely packed limestone and marl was favourable to drilling and the tunnel advanced at a respectable  a month. The tunnel passes underneath seven Métro lines, the sewers, Clichy-Capucines, and four underground carparks and passes over two RER lines.

Works at the site and the excavation of excavated material from the bassin de l'Arsenal were delayed two weeks by a flood of the Seine, the waterway route having been chosen to minimise heavy traffic in the city. The tunnel reached the future Pyramides station on 17 January 1995, and Madeleine on 15 March; it stopped underneath boulevard Haussmann in August and was brought to the surface through shafts there the same month.

At the other end of the line, from Gare de Lyon to Tolbiac the tunnel was excavated directly from the surface. It crossed the Seine upstream from pont de Tolbiac, supported by submerged beams the traditional under fluvial support. The last was implanted on 28 September 1994.

As a cost-saving measure, the section from Gare de Lyon to the Bassin de l'Arsenal was excavated at the same time as the tunnels of Line D of the RER Châtelet–Les Halles.

Incidents 
Travellers have been largely satisfied with Line 14's speed and service. However, despite its automation it has not been free of accidents. While the platform doors prevent access to the rails, they are susceptible to electric outages which have halted service entirely. On 20 September 2004, two trains stopped entirely in the tunnel after a signalling failure. On 22 December 2006, passengers were trapped for one and a half hours after an electrical failure on the line which arose from a mechanical failure. Technological failures have occurred twice: on 21 March 2007 traffic was interrupted between Gare de Lyon and Bibliothèque François-Mitterrand; and again on 21 August 2007 a technical failure stopped service.

Extensions 

Traffic on the line grew quickly: in October 2003, after five years in service there were 240,000 daily passengers. The same year service was interrupted several times to allow the installation of material for an extension north from Madeleine to Saint-Lazare. This section was opened on 16 December 2003, and the line saw a 30% increase in traffic thereafter; after Gare du Nord the northern terminus of Line 14 is the most important node on the network.

In 2007, the line was extended south to Olympiades, an area of high rise towers in the XIIIe arrondissement poorly served by the Métro. The construction of the extension was relatively simple, as the tunnel was built at the same time as the rest of the line. Initially planned to open in 2006, work was delayed by the collapse of a primary school courtyard during the night of 14–15 October 2006. Since then traffic has grown again: at the end of 2007, on average 450,000 passengers took the line on a working day. Due to its use as a train maintenance area, a new maintenance area was constructed.

On December 14, 2020, the second northern extension to Mairie de Saint-Ouen opened, allowing for the section of Line 13 between this station and Saint-Lazare to eventually become desaturated. The extension was originally supposed to open in 2017, but construction was postponed several times during the course of 2016 and 2017. The COVID-19 pandemic also hampered opening efforts during the course of 2020. The opening of this extension lengthened the 14 from 9km to just shy of 14km.

Both future ends of the line were connected with the completion of the digging of the final tunnel of the southern extension on 3 March 2021 and the one of the northern extension on 15 April 2021.

Statistics 
The number of passengers grew year-by-year on the line.

Impact
The experience in automated control and doors has inspired several new projects. In 1998, the RATP began planning to automate several existing lines, despite the heavy cost. Automation work on Line 1 began in 2007, along with the introduction of doors on the platform. The upgrade was finished in 2012. In 2022, Line 4 was upgraded and automated following the successful Line 1 project.

The widespread introduction of platform doors for passenger safety is planned, despite the project's cost. In January 2004, ground level signalling to indicate the doorways was tested on Line 13 at Saint-Lazare station. Several different door models were tested during 2006 and Kaba was chosen to supply them. After testing, platform doors will be rolled out across the network, first in certain stations on Line 13, then on the totality of Line 1 in preparation for its complete automation.

Technology
This new line parallel to Line A took the opportunity to incorporate innovations on the rest of the network: the stations are larger and, at 120 metres, longer and thus can accommodate eight carriages. The runs between stations are longer, allowing a rolling speed of close to 40 km per hour, close to double that of the other Paris metro lines and approaching that of the RER. Lastly, the line is completely automated and runs without any driver, the first large-scale metro line in a capital to do so (although driverless operation had been used on the VAL system in Lille and the MAGGALY technology of Lyon Metro Line D).

Some features of Line 14's train control system are run under the OpenVMS operating system. Its control system is noted in the field of software engineering of critical systems because safety properties on some safety-critical parts of the systems were proved using the B-Method, a formal method.

Line 14 has some unusual design features – unlike other stations in Paris, its floor tiling is not bitumenised, and platform screen doors at stations prevent passengers from falling onto the track or from committing suicide.

Signaling system
Météor as CBTC (Communication-based train control) system was supplied by Siemens Transportation Systems including monitoring from an operations control centre, equipment for 7 stations and equipment for 19 six-car trains, resulting in a headway of 85 seconds. It was the base for the Trainguard MT CBTC, which then equipped other rapid transit lines throughout the world.

Rolling stock
Line 14 uses rubber-tire rolling stock. Three types of trains are used: MP 89CA (21 trains as of 3 November 2013), MP 05 (11 trains as of 20 March 2016), and MP 14 (22 train as of November 2022). Plans are underway to displace all MP89 and MP05 trains on Line 14 with trains of class MP 14. As of 2018, the MP89 and MP05 contain six cars. The MP14 trains which are displacing the MP89 and MP05 have eight cars. (the Line 14 stations are designed to accommodate eight cars).

Future

As part of the Grand Paris Express expansion plans, Line 14 is being expanded both north and south.

Line 14 was extended north from Saint-Lazare, with a principal aim of reducing overcrowding on line 13. The adopted solution crosses the two branches of line 13 with stations at Porte de Clichy on the Asnières – Gennevilliers branch and Mairie de Saint-Ouen on the Saint-Denis branch. Another station interconnects with the RER C station Saint-Ouen, another one with the Transilien Paris – Saint-Lazare lines at Pont Cardinet, and the last one will interconnect with the RER D at Saint-Denis Pleyel. Construction on the extension began in 2014, and it was opened on 17 December 2020, except for Saint-Denis Pleyel.

Line 14 is also being extended southeastward from Olympiades towards Orly Airport, with 6 intermediate stations. The opening is currently scheduled for 2024.

In February 2012 the STIF announced that, with the two extensions planned, a brand new class of rolling stock, the MP 14 will replace the current line of MP 89CA (and upcoming MP 05) stock along Line 14 around 2020. This new stock will consist of eight-car train formations, longer than used to date on the Métro, and the MP 89CA and MP 05 stock will be reassigned to other lines (including the possibility of Lines 4, 6, or 11, should they one day become automated).

Route and stations

Route 

Line 14 has interchanges with the five lines of the RER, and quickly links Saint-Lazare with Gare de Lyon, via Châtelet. The line begins underneath Saint-Lazare in a two way tunnel-head, after stopping in that station, it heads southwards, descending beneath buildings and winding around Line 12 and RER Line A. It bends eastward and passes underneath Line 12, before entering, straight on, the station Madeleine, situated on the northern corner of the eponymous church, underneath the narrow rue de Sèze. The tunnel quickly descends on a 4.0% slope underneath Line 8, itself nestled underneath the boulevards de la Madeleine and des Capucines, Line 14 continues at this depth underneath the buildings above. The 794-metre journey to the station Pyramides finishes with a 4.5% climb to the station established just below l'avenue de l'Opéra.

Stations

Architecture

The conceptual design of the stations sought to evoke space and openness. The size of stations, their corridors and transfer halls brings the line architecturally closer to those of the RER rather than the existing Métro lines. The RATP opted for a specific style of the new line, for instance lightly coloured tiling rather than bitumen. The use of space was designed in a contemporary manner: voluminous spaces mixed plenty of light with modern materials and overall eased the flow of passengers. According to the designers, the stations should be the reflection of a "noble public space, monumental in spirit, urban in its choice of forms and materials". Four architects designed the first seven stations on the line: Jean-Pierre Vaysse & Bernard Kohn six of them, and Antoine Grumbach &t Pierre Schall the station Bibliothèque.

Saint-Lazare benefits from a well of natural light visible on the platforms, even though they are five levels below the surface. The station's exit is constructed from a glass bubble designed by Jean-Marie Charpentier and situated just in front of the Gare de Paris-Saint-Lazare, pointing towards the row of bus-stops.

Pyramides and Madeleine are endowed with a particular lighting, bright sunshine outside falls onto the platforms; a system which evidently does not work at night. Madeleine has several video projectors which allow cultural installations, for example, one on Marlène Dietrich, an actress, during the autumn of 2003.

Gare de Lyon offers travellers the view of a tropical garden on the right side of trains towards Olympiades, as one enters the station. This garden is situated underneath RATP House at the foot of which the station was built. It occupies a space originally reserved for the Transport Museum. Moreover, it is the only station equipped with a central platform, the only possible layout in light of the density of underground construction in the area.

Bibliothèque François-Mitterrand has its own unique design: monumental, fifteen metre pillars and stairs forming a semi-circle seventy metres in diameter.

Olympiades station was developed by the architects Ar.thème Associés following the line's guiding principles, defined by Bernard Kohn from 1991. The station thus is in keeping with others in its choice of materials (polished concrete arches, wood on the ceilings, etc.) as much as in its lighting, height of its ceilings, and platforms larger than the average on other lines.

On the other hand, certain stations on the line are notable due to the disagreeable odour of humidity and sulfur that one can sometimes find as far as the changeover halls. Due to the line's relative depth, it runs underneath the water-table, creating a constant risk of seepage, similar to that found on Line E of the RER.

See also

Notes

References

  Special issue Naissance d'un métro (nouvelle ligne 14), La Vie du Rail magazine, October 1998 (see in the bibliography)

Bibliography

External links

  RATP official website
 RATP English language website
 Interactive Map of the RER (from RATP's website)
 Interactive Map of the Paris métro (from RATP's website)
  Mobidf website, dedicated to the RER (unofficial)
  Metro-Pole website, dedicated to Paris public transports (unofficial)
Paris Metro – Line 14 – St Lazare to Olympiades A passenger's video recording of a trip down the length of the line
The French Meteor about the Météor project

Siemens Mobility projects
Railway lines opened in 1998
Automated guideway transit